The Union of Belgian Textile Workers (TACB; , COTB) was a trade union representing workers in the textile trades in Belgium.

The union was founded in 1898 as the National Textile Workers' Association of Belgium, linked to the Belgian Workers Party.  In 1908, it became the Textile Workers Center of Belgium, with the wool workers federation of Verviers joining.  However, after World War I, the Flemish leadership decided to centralise the union, and the Verviers federation left, only rejoining in 1935.  In 1945, the union was a founding constituent of the General Federation of Belgian Labour.

The union's membership peaked at 79,953 in 1953, then fell steadily, in line with employment in the industry.  By 1993, it had only 28,126 members.  The following year, it union merged with the Union of Clothing Workers and Kindred Trades in Belgium and the General Diamond Workers' Association of Belgium, to form the Textile-Clothing-Diamond Union.

Presidents
1921: Alfons Segier
1932:
1954: Alfons Baeyens
1963: Marcel Lefèvre
1976:
1980: Jan Monserez
1988: Donald Wittevrongel

References

Trade unions in Belgium
Textile and clothing trade unions
Trade unions established in 1898
Trade unions disestablished in 1994
1898 establishments in Belgium
1994 disestablishments in Belgium